Kopsia arborea is a tree in the family Apocynaceae.

Description
The bark is grey. Its flowers feature a white corolla. In China, local traditional medicinal uses include as an enema and as a treatment for tonsilitis.

Distribution and habitat
Kopsia arborea is native to China, Thailand, Vietnam, Malesia and Australia. It is found in a variety of habitats from sea level to  altitude.

References
 
 

arborea
Medicinal plants of Asia
Flora of China
Flora of tropical Asia
Flora of Queensland
Plants described in 1823